Lookout on Cross Hill is a popular scenic viewpoint and tourist attraction in Puerto Vallarta, in the Mexican state of Jalisco.

In Fodor's 2021 overview of "ultimate things to do" in the city, Nathan Aguilera said, "The hike is a bit grueling but doesn’t last long, and you’ll be rewarded with some of the best views in all of Puerto Vallarta. The stairs are steep and rustic at best, so this is another tour not suited for those with mobility issues, and again, you’ll need to be reasonably fit."

References

External links

 

Puerto Vallarta
Scenic viewpoints
Tourist attractions in Jalisco
Outdoor structures in Mexico